is a passenger railway station located in  Kanazawa-ku, Yokohama, Kanagawa Prefecture, Japan, operated by the private railway company Keikyū.

Lines
Keikyū Tomioka Station is served by the Keikyū Main Line and is located 36.7 kilometers from the terminus of the line at Shinagawa  Station in Tokyo.

Station layout
The station consists of a single elevated island platform and single side platform serving three tracks, with the station building located underneath.

Platforms

History
The station closed on January 10, 1947, and reopened on March 1, 1947 exclusively for the use by American occupation forces in Japan. Ordinary Japanese citizens were permitted to use the station again in late 1948. The station was relocated to its present address on December 1, 1955 and renamed  on November 1, 1963. It assumed its present name on June 1, 1987.

Keikyū introduced station numbering to its stations on 21 October 2010; Keikyū Tomioka Station was assigned station number KK47.

Passenger statistics
In fiscal 2019, the station was used by an average of 21,764 passengers daily. 

The passenger figures for previous years are as shown below.

Surrounding area
 Kanagawa Prefectural Kanazawa Comprehensive High School
Yokohama City Tomioka Elementary School
Yokohama Tomioka Post Office
Tomioka Hachiman-gu

See also
 List of railway stations in Japan

References

External links

 

Railway stations in Kanagawa Prefecture
Railway stations in Japan opened in 1930
Keikyū Main Line
Railway stations in Yokohama